Statistics of Latvian Higher League in the 1946 season.

Overview
It was contested by 8 teams, and Daugava won the championship.

League standings

References
RSSSF

Latvian SSR Higher League
Football 
Latvia